Dominik Sollfrank (born 10 April 1998) is a German footballer who last played as a defender for SC Verl.

References

External links
 

Living people
1998 births
Association football defenders
German footballers
SpVgg Greuther Fürth players
2. Bundesliga players